Things Go Better with RJ and AL is the second studio album by American hip hop duo Soul Position. It was released on Rhymesayers Entertainment on April 4, 2006. It peaked at number 45 on the Billboard Independent Albums chart.

Critical reception
At Metacritic, which assigns a weighted average score out of 100 to reviews from mainstream critics, the album received an average score of 64% based on 7 reviews, indicating "generally favorable reviews".

Marisa Brown of AllMusic gave the album 4 stars out of 5, saying, "Soul Position don't deviate much from their combination of original rhymes and interesting, thoughtful music, but there's really no need to when it sounds so good." Mosi Reeves of Phoenix New Times called it "a solid banger from start to finish." Noel Dix of Exclaim! said, "Soul Position definitely have what it takes to make an incredible album, but given the fact their best effort thus far is an EP, maybe RJ and Blueprint should limit their collaborations to six solid joints at a time from now on."

In 2018, Henry Adaso of ThoughtCo placed "The Cool Thing to Do" at number 99 on the "100 Best Rap Songs of the 2000s" list.

Track listing

Charts

References

External links
 

2006 albums
Soul Position albums
Rhymesayers Entertainment albums